The Brooklyn by-election 1951 was a by-election held in the  electorate in Wellington during the 29th New Zealand Parliament, on 17 February 1951.

Background
The by-election was caused by the death of incumbent MP Peter Fraser, who had been Prime Minister until the 1949 general election, on 17 December 1950 after a long illness. Labour's deputy leader, Walter Nash deliberately brought the election of leader to replace Fraser to before the by-election so that if the Labour candidate was successful they would be unable to either participate or contest the position as only elected members of the caucus were eligible to stand. His decision caused a heated debate in caucus, though it was eventually voted for by a caucus majority of two to proceed with the early vote.

Candidates

Communist Party
The Communist Party (CPNZ) initially offered not to contest the by-election, approaching the Labour Party to withdraw in their favour on condition that Labour adopt several CPNZ policy platforms, notably an immediate withdrawal of New Zealand troops from the Korean War. Labour (who supported the Korean War) rebuffed the offer so the CPNZ ran a candidate. Connie Birchfield, their candidate for Brooklyn in 1949, was selected to stand again.

Labour Party
He was the sole nominee and therefore selected unopposed. There was initially speculation that the president of the  branch Frank Kitts might stand. Kitts was a Wellington City Councillor and Labour's mayoral candidate in 1950, who was only narrowly defeated.

National Party
There were four nominees for the National Party candidacy:
Berta Burns, a former schoolteacher and journalist who was National's candidate for Brooklyn in 1949.
Samuel Frickleton, a Victoria Cross recipient from the First World War working as a contact officer at the Rehabilitation Department.
Leonard Theodor Jacobsen, a local businessman who was a Wellington City Councillor from 1944 until 1950 and National's candidate for Miramar in 1946.
Elizabeth Reenberg, a nurse who was a Citizens' Association candidate for the Wellington Hospital Board at the 1950 local-body elections.

Jacobsen was chosen after winning a ballot of local party members.

Results
The following table gives the election results:

Outcomes
Nordmeyer was elected with a 2.35% swing. While National had won the 1949 election, both the 1950 local body elections and the by-election result pointed to the fact that National's hold on power was tenuous. National's vote fell causing party officials concern over many urban seats which had been won in 1949 only by low majorities. Deputy Prime Minister Keith Holyoake denied that the government's popularity had been impaired and stated that Labour had not offered any worthy suggestions on how the problems of the day could be handled.

References

Brooklyn 1951
1951 elections in New Zealand
Politics of the Wellington Region
February 1951 events in New Zealand
1950s in Wellington